The Conservative Victory Project is a political initiative launched in 2013 by Karl Rove, the prominent Republican political activist, and the super-PAC American Crossroads. Its purpose is to support "electable" conservative political candidates for political office in the United States. The effort was prompted by embarrassing failures of several Tea Party and independent conservative candidates in the elections of 2012. The project has been strongly criticized by some other conservative activists, including Newt Gingrich who described it as a "terrible idea."

Notes

Politics of the United States
2013 establishments in the United States